Walk on Well Lighted Streets is the second studio album by American new wave pop group Gleaming Spires. Like their debut, Songs of the Spires, the album was produced by Stephen Hague.

History 
In addition to the core duo of bassist/lead vocalist Leslie Bohem and drummer David Kendrick, the Spires lineup was augmented on this album (as well as their previous release, 1982's Life Out on the Lawn EP) to include guitarist Bob Haag and keyboardist Jim "Jimbo" Goodwin, all of whom recorded and toured with Sparks during this time. As a result, unlike the rough demo recordings of the previous album, Walk on Well Lighted Streets features a full band arrangement and a more distinctive "new wave" sound. The album has been described as featuring music that "manages to be simultaneously catchy and quirky," with lyrics "more bizarre than ever." 

A music video was created for the song "A Christian Girl's Problems," featuring the band members dressed in Roman gladiator outfits running in place against a chroma-keyed backdrop. The front cover painting, "Bed of Nails," was painted by Mark Kostabi. The back cover features photographs of the band members bordered by humorous variations of the album title, including promenade down cool shady lanes, tromp down brightly illuminated sidewalks, and come over to my house for a sandwich.

Release 
Walk on Well Lighted Streets was originally released on vinyl in 1983 by Posh Boy Records. In 2021, the album was reissued on CD and to streaming services by Omnivore Recordings.

Track listing

Personnel 
Credits are adopted from the Walk on Well Lighted Streets liner notes.

 Leslie Bohem - lead vocals, bass guitar
 David Kendrick - drums, percussion
 Bob Haag - guitar
 Jimbo Goodwin - keyboards
 Stephen Hague - additional synthesizers, guitar, bass, production, engineering
 Paul Cutler - additional guitar
 Mark Kostabi - front cover painting
 Beth Herzhaft - photography
 The Bunker Enterprises - graphics

References 

1983 albums
Gleaming Spires albums
albums produced by Stephen Hague